Michael Calvin McGee (October 21, 1943 in Rockwood, Tennessee – October 27, 2002 in Iowa City, Iowa) was an American rhetorical theorist, writer, and social critic.

Personal life
The son of John Vester and Dorothy Eloise (Hicks) McGee, he spent his early years in Knoxville, Tennessee. He graduated with a B.A. in Speech from Butler University, where he was a champion debater. In 1967 he graduated with a M.A. in Rhetoric from Cornell University. In 1973 he married Lyda Eugenia Twitty. In 1974 he received his Ph.D. from the University of Iowa, writing his dissertation "Edmund Burke's Beautiful Life: An Exploration of the Relationship between Rhetoric and Social Theory" under Donald C. Bryant. He received some criticism for his teaching because of his staunch liberalism, which had an effect on his teaching style, but despite this, he was still a very sought-after professor, teaching  at major universities in the United States such as the University of Alabama, the University of Memphis, and the University of Wisconsin–Madison. He is known for his materialistic views of rhetoric, summarized from the lesser known McGee essay "The Practical Identity of Thought and Its Expression". In 1979 he moved to Iowa City, where he settled in at the University of Iowa.

Major contributions
McGee had many major contributions in the realm of rhetoric and in cultural studies. He published three major works: Rhetoric in Postmodern America, The Ideograph: A Link between Rhetoric and Ideology, and Text, Context, and the Fragmentation of Contemporary Culture. The most important of these is considered to be his second major work, The Ideograph. McGee was the first rhetorical theorist to propose this concept on an ideograph, which he described as, "an ordinary-language term found in political discourse. It is a high order abstraction representing commitment to a particular but equivocal and ill-defined normative goal." Also he was a critic of what he saw going on in the world around him. The most well-known of these critiques was his critique of Spike Lee and his association with Nike ads. McGee said that these ads were too racially stereotypical and made a case for Lee to cease these ads but Lee continued with them nonetheless.

Later life

McGee was one of the founders of the American Communication Association and a member of the National Communication Association. In his last years he was very active in virtual rhetorical communities and on-line debates. McGee founded a website, (f)ragments, for rhetorical research and created a virtual learning community.

References

External links
American Communication Association
National Communication Association

1943 births
2002 deaths
20th-century American educators
Cornell University alumni
People from Knoxville, Tennessee
Writers from Iowa City, Iowa
University of Alabama faculty
University of Iowa alumni
University of Iowa faculty
University of Wisconsin–Madison faculty
Butler University alumni
People from Rockwood, Tennessee